Paxton may refer to:

People and fictional characters
 Paxton (name), a list of people and fictional characters with either the surname or given name

Places

Australia
 Paxton, New South Wales

United Kingdom
 Paxton, Scottish Borders

United States
 Paxton, California
 Paxton, Florida
 Paxton, Illinois
 Paxton, Indiana
 Paxton, Massachusetts
 Paxton, Nebraska
 Paxton, West Virginia
 Paxton Township, Minnesota
 Paxton Township, Ross County, Ohio
 Paxton Creek, a tributary of the Susquehanna River in Pennsylvania

Businesses 
 Paxton Automotive, an American manufacturer of automotive superchargers
 Paxton Hotel, formerly Paxton Manor and currently The Paxton, in Downtown Omaha, Nebraska, U.S.
 Paxton Media Group, an American media company

Other uses
 Paxton (fish), a genus of fish from the family Apogonidae
 Paxton (soil), the state soil of Massachusetts
 Paxton man-powered aircraft, a British sporting human-powered aircraft

See also
 Great Paxton, England
 Little Paxton, England
 Paxton House, Berwickshire, Scotland
 Paxton's Tower, near the National Botanic Garden of Wales in Carmarthenshire, Wales
 Lower Paxton Township, Pennsylvania
 Middle Paxton Township, Pennsylvania
 Upper Paxton Township, Pennsylvania